Cirrhilabrus condei are fairy wrasse which is also known as Conde's wrasse. They originate from the shallow rubble flats of Melanesia.  The Conde's fairy wrasse is very peaceful, they are red alone black with a white belly. Female Conde's wrasse are red with a pale stripe along the lower rear, a black dorsal fin, a pale stripe with a white lower body, and a red anal fin.  Males are similar with more intense coloration. The life cycle and mating behavior of Cirrhilabrus condei distinct pairing during breeding. Unlike other wrasses, raise the front 2/3rds of their dorsal fins and sometimes colors may warry depending on the fish's mood, breeding timeframe, and age of the specimen

Size

Etymology
The fish is named in honor of zoologist Bruno Condé (fr) (1920-2004), the director of l’Aquarium de Nancy, because of his service as the editor of Revue française d’Aquariologie, the journal in which the description appeared. and for his contributions to the aquarium field.

References

condei
Taxa named by John Ernest Randall
Taxa described in 1996
Taxa named by Gerald R. Allen